Cheddar Ales is an independent, artisanal brewery located in the village of Cheddar in Somerset, England, which produces a range of regular and seasonal beers. Its owner and head brewer, Jem Ham, previously worked 15 years at another local brewery before going out on his own.

Products

The brewery produces seven regular beers and the occasional seasonal brew.
 Gorge Best Bitter – 4.0% abv (Nothing to do with any footballer past or present but a good pun nonetheless) Best Bitter just got better.
 Potholer – 4.3% abv golden bitter. The name is derived from the sport of potholing (cave exploration), which is popular in the Caves of the Mendip Hills.
 Totty Pot Porter – 4.5% abv porter, first produced in December 2007. Named after a small cave at the top of Cheddar Gorge.
 Goat's Leap – 5.5% abv India Pale Ale (IPA). Named after a point on the Kaveri River near Bangalore in India.
 Hardrock – 4.4% abv Pale Ale (Simply Rock Hard)
 Bitter Bully – 3.8% abv Pale Ale (You can`t beat a Bitter Bully)
 Crown and Glory – 4.6% abv (Helping to put the "Great" back into Great Britain)

Awards

In 2007, Potholer won a silver medal at the Society of Independent Brewers annual Maltings Beer Festival.
In 2009, Totty Pot Porter won Bronze Medal in the Champion Bottled Beers at the SIBA National Beer Competition, and a gold award at the International Beer Challenge, where it won best bottled beer.

Community
The brewery holds occasional beer festivals featuring both its own and guest beers, plus live music and in 2020 opened a full time tap room and pizza oven.

References

External links
 Official Website

Companies based in Somerset
Breweries in England
Food and drink companies established in 2006
2006 establishments in England